Karahisar (former Karaasar) is a town in Tavas district of Denizli Province, Turkey. It is situated at  along the Akçay creek, a tributary of Büyükmenderes River (historical Maeander). The population of Karahisar was 3403   as of 2012. The settlement was founded in 1530s by [Armenians]. The earlier name of the settlement Karaasar probably refers to Kara Fatma, the wife of the tribe. Gülfem one of the concubines of Suleyman I, the Ottoman sultan (also called the Magnificent)  commissioned a mosque and a fountain in the settlement. In 1954 the settlement was declared a seat of township.

References

Populated places in Denizli Province
Towns in Turkey
Tavas District